Moss District Court is a district court located in Moss, Norway.  It covers the municipalities of Moss,  Rygge, Råde and Våler and is subordinate Borgarting Court of Appeal.

References

External links 
Official site 

Defunct district courts of Norway
Organisations based in Moss, Norway